Brahmavidya  is that branch of scriptural knowledge derived primarily through a study of the Upanishads, Brahma Sūtras and Bhagavad Gita. Derived from the sanskrit words brahma and vidyā, brahman is the neuter gender of the root word-form brih that means big. As the word big has not been further qualified to reveal its dimension, we have to understand that brahman the word means that which is free from all forms of limitation. Vidya is derived from the root vid, which means to know, hence the word vidya means knowledge. Brahma Vidya therefore means knowledge of that which is free from all forms of limitation. Brahmavidya is the spiritual knowledge of the Absolute. Brahmavidya is considered to be the highest ideal of classical Indian thought. Brahmavidya does not pertain only to Hinduism, as many other faiths practice and learn brahmvidya through different means; for example, the Sikhs practice and learn brahmavidya through their Guru, the eternal Guru of the Sikhs, Guru Granth Sahib Ji. Each faith teaches about the divine through different studies, yet the brahmavidya is one and the same - Truth itself.

In the Puranas, this is divided into two branches, the first one dealing with the Vedic mantras and is called para-vidya or 'former knowledge', and the latter dealing with the study of the Upanishads and is called the apara-vidya or 'latter knowledge'. Both para- and apara-vidya constitute brahma-vidya. The Mundaka Upanishad says that "Brahma-vidya sarva-vidya pratistha", which means "The Knowledge of Brahman is the foundation of all knowledge."

Etymology
Brahma - The word Brahma is used in modern Hinduism to refer to the name of the Hindu Creator god who is a part of the Hindu trinity, but in relation to Brahmavidya, Brahma is referring to the ultimate reality called Brahman. For more information see Brahman. In the context of traditional Vedic study, Brahma holds two meanings. In the Pūrva Mimamsa philosophy, which is based on a study of the samhita and brahmana sections of the vedas, the word brahma refers to the vedic mantras. In the uttara Mimamsa i.e. Vedanta philosophy, which is based on a study of the Aranyaka and the Upanishad sections of the vedas, the word Brahma means the absolute universal reality called Brahman.

Vidya - The word vidyā (विद्या) means "knowledge," and is derived from the Sanskrit verbal root -vid- ("to know"), also seen in the word Veda. Its cognates in other Indo-European languages are: 
 Greek εἶδον for ἐϝιδον ("I saw"), οἶδα for ϝοιδα ("I know")
 Latin vidēre ("to see")
 Slavic věděti
 Gothic witan, wait
 Germanic wizzan, wissen ("to know")
 English wisdom, wit

Current usage
In modern Hinduism, Brahmavidya is used to mean a spiritual study of Hindu scriptures with the aim of realizing the ultimate reality. Different modern Hindu leaders have defined it in the context of their own systems of philosophy.

Swami Sivananda, the founder of the Divine Life Society opines that Brahmavidya is the "Science of sciences" or the "Science of the Absolute".

References

Hindu philosophy